The Radiology-Integrated Training Initiative (R-ITI) is a public-sector UK programme to provide an increased number of high-quality radiologists by 2008.

R-ITI is a collaboration between the Royal College of Radiologists, the UK Department of Health and the NHS. It is tasked with providing three new radiology academies, a national archive of peer-validated cases (Validated Case Archive), and over 1,000 e-learning sessions for self-paced learning & knowledge acquisition.

The reasoning
The UK is currently not producing enough UK trained radiologists to meet clinical need. Calculations show that traditional training will not produce the necessary increase in numbers. Training schemes are becoming saturated and consultant training time is pressurised by heavy service workloads.

The Radiology Integrated Training Initiative (R-ITI) has been created to respond to this need and develop a new approach to training radiologists, increasing capacity to meet demand without putting additional strain on current resources.

Three academies have been established, one in Leeds, one in Norwich at the Norfolk and Norwich University Hospital and one in Plymouth. A fourth academy has been announced in South Wales, to begin intake in August 2017. Each academy offers trainees access to: 
computer linked e-learning sessions 
the Validated Case Archive (VCA) where they can study images and films of actual cases alongside their pathologies and diagnoses 
skills labs to practice practical techniques before going into clinics 
library and tutorial/lecture room facilities 
Norwich Radiology Academy Website

About Integrated Training Initiatives
The Integrated Training Initiative (ITI) creates a stimulating learning environment by combining different teaching methods. These methods include: 
e-learning 
self-assessment using an archive of validated images (VCA) 
formal assessments 
skills labs 
tutorials/lectures 
clinical placements

Key principles of an ITI
To use small groups and peer learning to enhance the learning experience 
To use technology to extend and enhance the clinical learning environment 
To reach larger numbers of trainees within the existing training structure 
To extend the clinical environment by involving trainees in local service delivery 
To provide more consistent training and effective resources

Website
RITI web site

Radiology organizations
Medical and health organisations based in the United Kingdom